The men's 100 metre backstroke competition of the swimming events at the 1955 Pan American Games took place on 23 March. The last Pan American Games champion was Allen Stack of US.

This race consisted of two lengths of the pool, all in backstroke.

Results
All times are in minutes and seconds.

Heats

Final 
The final was held on March 23.

References

Swimming at the 1955 Pan American Games